SmartDraw is a web-based diagramming tool used by teams to collaborate on and make flowcharts, organization charts, mind maps, project charts, and other business visuals.

Integration and Add-Ons
SmartDraw lets you add diagrams to Microsoft Office products including Word, PowerPoint, and Excel and Google Workspace applications like Google Docs and Google Sheets. 

SmartDraw has apps for Atlassian's Confluence, Jira, and Trello.

SmartDraw lets users save files to Sharepoint, OneDrive, Google Drive, Dropbox, and Box.

SmartDraw also integrates with Microsoft Teams and can generate diagrams using data from Azure and AWS.

Product history

File Format
The following file extensions are specific to SmartDraw:
.SDR – “SmartDraw Documents,” a binary file format used for saving SmartDraw documents.
.SDT – “Smart/Draw Templates,” a binary file format used for saving SmartDraw reusable document templates.
.SDL – “SmartDraw Libraries,” a binary file format used for saving symbol libraries in SmartDraw.
.SCZ - "SmartDraw Collections," a binary file format used for saving SmartDraw collections.

See also
Data flow diagram
Flowchart
List of concept- and mind-mapping software
List of concept mapping software
List of UML tools
Mind mapping

Technical drawing
Visual communication

References

External links
 

Diagramming software
Windows graphics-related software